New Dublin Presbyterian Church is a historic Presbyterian church complex located at Dublin, Pulaski County, Virginia. It was built in 1875, and incorporates part of a church built in 1840.  It is a one-story, gable-roofed stuccoed brick church building.  It primarily exhibits Greek Revival style character, with Gothic Revival style influences.  It features a front entry with fanlight, a rose window, two-bay side elevations, a metal sheathed
gable roof, and a limestone foundation.  Also on the property are a contributing 1874 manse, a cemetery established on the eve of the American Civil War, and an outbuilding.

It was added to the National Register of Historic Places in 2004.

A 150 year old Copper Beech tree had toppled over in the yard of the Church in 2021.

References

Churches on the National Register of Historic Places in Virginia
Presbyterian churches in Virginia
National Register of Historic Places in Pulaski County, Virginia
Greek Revival church buildings in Virginia
Gothic Revival church buildings in Virginia
19th-century Presbyterian church buildings in the United States
Churches completed in 1858
Churches in Pulaski County, Virginia